H.R.L. Morrison & Co (Morrison & Co) is a specialist alternative asset manager focusing primarily on infrastructure, private equity and property investment with offices in New Zealand, Australia, United Kingdom, United States, Singapore and Hong Kong.

History
Morrison & Co was founded in 1988 by H. R. Lloyd Morrison offering a broad range of investment advisory services to private and public sectors in New Zealand and Australia. Headquartered in Wellington, New Zealand, in the early 1990s Morrison & Co narrowed its focus to infrastructure investment and advisory services as major privatizations took place in Australia and New Zealand. After launching Infratil in 1994, Morrison & Co became an increasingly active investor and adviser in privatisations of Australasian airports, ports and energy businesses. In 2009, Morrison & Co launched the Public Infrastructure Partnership Fund, New Zealand's first fund dedicated to investing in public private partnerships. In 2018, Morrison & Co established the Morrison & Co Growth Infrastructure Fund, a co-mingled fund targeting risk-adjusted returns through unlisted infrastructure assets with a strong sustainability focus. Also in 2018, Morrison & Co took over management of Utilities Trust of Australia (UTA) and its portfolio of core infrastructure assets. During the following three years, Morrison & Co expanded its presence outside New Zealand and Australia into Asia, Europe, UK and North America. 

In 2021, Morrison & Co raised USD 3 billion for a new open-ended global infrastructure fund.

Business summary

Infratil
Morrison & Co launched Infratil, one of the world's first listed infrastructure funds in 1994. Infratil is listed on both the New Zealand Exchange and Australian Securities Exchange and was named Deloitte/Management Magazine Company of the Year in 2007. Infratil's major investments include TrustPower, Wellington Airport, Vodafone New Zealand RetireAustralia and CDC Data Centres.  
Infratil pays Morrison & Co a management fee that is tied to the total value of assets under management.  Infratil’s after tax return since listing in March 1994 has been 18.7% per annum to March 2022, and over the last ten years the returns have averaged 21.6% per annum after tax. In 2021, Infratil was recognised in the IJInvestor awards with APAC Fund Performance of the year.

Infratil Australia Limited
Morrison & Co also managed Infratil Australia Limited from its founding in 1994 until 31 July 2000 when the fund was subject to a takeover by the Australian Infrastructure Fund. Prior to the takeover, Infratil Australia Limited owned stakes in Perth Airport, Darwin International Airport, Alice Springs Airport Territories Airports, Southern Hydro, and Port of Portland in Australia (Portland, Victoria).

Utilities Trust of Australia
In July 2018, Morrison & Co took over management of Utilities Trust of Australia (UTA) from Hastings Funds Management and its A$6bn portfolio of core infrastructure assets. This was a result of the sale of Hastings Fund Management by Westpac to Northill Capital in December 2017, which caused investors of the UTA who were unhappy with the sale to vote and terminate Hasting's mandate as manager.

UTA is an open-ended infrastructure fund established in 1994 and is one of Australia's first infrastructure investment funds. UTA has a globally diversified portfolio of quality assets and a track record of delivering strong returns with low volatility over time. This includes Australian Registry Investments, Perth Airport, TransGrid, Phoenix Natural Gas, South East Water. UTA also formerly owned M5 South West Motorway which it sold in 2019 and the former Sydney Light Rail owner Metro Transport Sydney.

In 2021, UTA was rated by GRESB as one of the top ten infrastructure funds globally and the leading fund in Oceania for its ESG performance.

New Zealand Superannuation Fund
Morrison & Co was appointed to manage a global infrastructure mandate by the New Zealand Superannuation Fund in March 2006.

The Morrison & Co Public Infrastructure Partnership Fund
In 2009, Morrison & Co launched of the Public Infrastructure Partnership Fund (PIP Fund), New Zealand's first fund dedicated to investing in PPPs.
The New Zealand Superannuation Fund is the cornerstone investor in the PIP Fund and Morrison & Co secured capital commitments from a number of New Zealand-based community trusts and institutional investors.  The PIP Fund has investment capacity to deliver around NZ$1 billion of social infrastructure under PPP structures. The New Zealand Social Infrastructure Fund was established in 2010 to enable private investors to participate in the PIP Fund.

On 10 December 2015 Morrison & Co announced first financial close of PIP II a follow on Fund to the original PIP again focused on investing in NZ PPP's. The first PIP fund is fully invested in Hobsonville Point Primary and Secondary Schools, Melbourne Convention Centre PPP, Bendigo Hospital key health worker accommodation, University of Wollongong Student Accommodation, NZ Schools II PPP (four schools in Auckland, Canterbury and Queenstown) and Auckland Prison PPP.

Morrison & Co Growth Infrastructure Fund 
In August 2020, Morrison & Co announced the successful third and final close of the Morrison & Co Growth Infrastructure Fund (MGIF)

MGIF's total fund size reached approx. A$580 million. MGIF takes a long-term perspective of investments, focusing on the fundamental value of essential infrastructure services, and targets gross returns of 13-15% per annum.

Other

In May 2019, Morrison & Co purchased agriculture business Sundrop Farms for an undisclosed sum.

In early 2021, Morrison & Co committed to being climate positive across its own operations. This means, where possible, its business will eliminate carbon emissions altogether, or alternatively, they will be offset through programmes that work with local communities.

In June 2021, a Morrison & Co managed consortium acquired 49 per cent of InfraCo Towers from Telstra Ltd, the largest network of mobile tower sites in Australia. The consortium comprised the Future Fund as its largest investor, Sunsuper and the Commonwealth Superannuation Corporation (CSC). The business later changed its name to Amplitel Ltd.

In 2021, its second CEO following H.R. Lloyd Morrison, Marko Bogoievski retired after 13 years, transitioning to new CEO, Paul Newfield, who was previously the Head of Australia & New Zealand. 

Marko was recognised by the IJGlobal Awards as Outstanding Individual of the Year and by the NZ Herald as a Business Hero in 2021.

Other activities
In March 2008 H.R.Lloyd Morrison launched a campaign to set a common goal for New Zealand, called "A measurable goal". This effort was in part motivated by forecasts showing New Zealand's current economic growth trajectory would see its GDP per capita ranking among countries falling to 47th.  In 1950 New Zealand was ranked in the top 10.

References

Financial services companies of New Zealand
Companies based in Wellington
Financial services companies established in 1988
Privately held companies of New Zealand
1988 establishments in New Zealand